Alpha Centauri b (or planet "b" of Alpha Centauri) may refer to:

Stars
 alpha Centauri B (Toliman), the second largest star in the α Cen trinary system

Planets
 alpha Centauri Ab, an unconfirmed candidate exoplanet orbiting the largest star in the α Cen trinary star system, Rigel Kentarus (α Cen A)
 alpha Centauri Bb, an proposed exoplanet orbiting the second largest star in the α Cen trinary star system, Toliman (α Cen B)
 alpha Centauri Cb, an exoplanet orbiting the smallest star in the α Cen trinary star system, Proxima (α Cen C)

See also
 Alpha Centauri (disambiguation)